The LHCf (Large Hadron Collider forward) is a special-purpose Large Hadron Collider experiment for astroparticle (cosmic ray) physics, and one of eight detectors in the LHC accelerator at CERN. The other seven are: ATLAS, ALICE, CMS, MoEDAL, TOTEM, LHCb and FASER. LHCf is designed to study the particles generated in the "forward" region of collisions, those almost directly in line with the colliding proton beams.  It therefore consists of two detectors, 140 m on either side of the interaction point.
Because of this large distance, it can co-exist with a more conventional detector surrounding the interaction point, and shares the interaction point IP1 with the much larger general-purpose ATLAS experiment.

Purpose

The LHCf is intended to measure the energy and numbers of neutral pions produced by the collider. This will hopefully help explain the origin of ultra-high-energy cosmic rays. The results will complement other high-energy cosmic ray measurements from the  Pierre Auger Observatory in Argentina, and the Telescope Array Project in Utah.

References
LHCf section on US/LHC Website
LHCf: a tiny new experiment joins the LHC, CERN Courier, Nov 1, 2006, retrieved on 2009-03-25. (Describes the location of the experiment.)
The LHCf experiment at LHC
Technical Design Report of LHCf
 (Full design documentation)
 (Full design documentation)

External links

 LHCf experiment  record on INSPIRE-HEP

CERN experiments
Particle experiments
Large Hadron Collider